Hanging Doll are a British gothic metal band from Birmingham. The members include: Sally Holliday (vocals/songwriter), Dan Leddy (guitars/vocals) and Kev Wilson (bass/vocals).

The full line-up of Hanging Doll took form after Dan, (a guitarist with a degree in orchestral composition) and Alex Cooper, who had been working together since 2002, invited Holliday, a professional photographer, to take pictures of an early version of the band in 2004 (Cooper, Leddy, Wilson and the original vocalist Emily Brownhill). After Brownhill quit shortly afterwards, Holliday was invited to audition and recruited to fill the position. Aryan Amoli was brought into the band on keyboards about a year later.
 
Hanging Doll debut album was Reason & Madness.

Hanging Doll were signed to Rocksector Records in early 2012 and announced they would release their next album The Sacred & Profane on 30 April 2012, with the first music video for the track "Carnival Of Sin" having already been released on 22 February of the same year. However the release of The Sacred & Profane was delayed and was released on 3 September. The previous album Reason & Madness was released on the record label Phoenix Music [UK] Ltd / Cargo Records.

Hanging Doll reform
On 19 April 2014 Cooper and Amoli left the band on good terms. The remaining members tried to keep things going, but on 5 July 2014 they disbanded.   Holliday, Leddy and Wilson have since taken new management, and are working on new material for a new album.

Line-up

Current members
Sally Holliday - vocals, songwriting
Dan Leddy - guitars, vocals
Kev Wilson - bass guitar, vocals

Discography

Studio albums

Whispers & Screams
CD, 2004 - Auto-Production

 Sleeping Beauty
 Beneath the Skin
 Land of the Living
 Not About Revenge
 Ring of Roses
 Last Straw Drawn
 Cut Me Up
 Sick
 Merciful Sleep
 No Doubt to Depart
 In This
 Slave to Circumstance

Reason & Madness
CD, October 2008 - Once Bitten Music (OBM)

 Reason & Madness
 Blood Ridden Skies
 Hope Springs Eternal
 Sweet Retribution
 Echoes of Sorrow
 A Formidable Mistake
 Forlorn
 Twist of a Deity
 Iniquity
 Silence in Solitude

The Sacred & Profane
CD, 3. September 2012 - Rocksector Records

 Cradle to the Grave
 Carnival of Sin
 Dark Narcissus (The Forest)
 Lacrimosa
 Only in My Reveries
 Immortal Beloved
 Tincture
 The Sacred & Profane
 Flames of Woe
 The Final Descent
 Bound in Servitude
 The Inauspicious Host
 A Question of Faith

EPs and singles

"Perverted Innocent" (EP)
EP, 2004 - Auto-Production

 Beneath the Skin
 Not About Revenge
 Last Straw Drawn
 In This

"What Lies in Truth" (EP)
EP, 2006 - Once Bitten Music (OBM)

 Sweet Retribution
 Forlorn
 Iniquity

Demos

"Hanging Doll" (Demo)
Demo, 2002 - Auto-Production

 Beneath the Skin
 Merciful Sleep
 Sickus Vomitus
 Appearances

References

External links 

British heavy metal musical groups